IBK may refer to:

 Hwaseong IBK Altos, a women's professional volleyball club in South Korea
 Ibk algorithm, implements the k-nearest neighbor algorithm
 Ibrahim Boubacar Keïta (1945-2022), former president and prime minister of Mali
 Industrial Bank of Korea, a bank headquartered in Seoul, South Korea
 Infectious bovine keratoconjunctivitis, an infection of cattle caused by a rod shaped bacterium
 Innsbruck Airport, an airport in Tyrol in western Austria
 Innsbruck, city in Tyrol in western Austria, Abbreviation commonly used in slang speech and social media